Architectonics designates the study or character of various types of structure.

It may also, more specifically, refer to:

Philosophy

Architectonics in Aristotelian philosophy
Kantian architectonics
C. S. Peirce's adaptation of the Kantian concept
Martial Guéroult's "architectonic unities"
 Michel Foucault's adaptation of the concept in his Archaeology of Knowledge

Science and engineering

Architectonics, the science of architectural design
Cytoarchitecture
Nanoarchitectonics, the arrangement of nanoscale structural units into complex configurations